Rao Muhammad Hashim Khan, was one of the oldest and most senior members of the Pakistan Peoples Party. He hails from District Pakpattan which is considered a stronghold of the Rao Family, who settled in this area after the independence of Pakistan in 1947.

Life

Early life 
He was born to Rao Chaudhri Muhammad Ali who was a government official  and his wife Hameeda Begum in 1923. In his early life he attended Government College Lahore for his Secondary Education. While there he took an active part in the extra curricular and sports activities in the college particularly in boxing and went on to take part in the National Level Inter Collegiate Boxing Championship in India. In addition while there he befriended Nobel Laureate Dr. Abdus Salam as well as legendary Bollywood actor Dev Anand. Being comparatively secular he befriended numerous Hindu and Sikh class fellows while still being an integral part of the Muslim student varsity at the college.
Later on he enrolled in the Aligarh Muslim University and gained his degree in Law. After becoming a lawyer he moved back to his hometown of Hisar and established a thriving practice there mostly in Criminal Law.

Career 
Thus having established a name for himself as a successful lawyer in the city and being one of the most prominent members of his tribe in the area, Zulfiqar Ali Bhutto invited him to contest on the ticket of the newly formed Pakistan People's Party in the 1970 elections.
 
He was an elected member of Pakistan National Assembly thrice since 1970. He took part in the 1970 and 1977 elections and was victorious. In 1988 he was unable to secure his seat in the National Assembly, but was nominated Chairman of the Land Commission. In 1993 he emerged victorious again and was elected as Chairman of 10th PAC, Pakistan on 28 August 1995.

Later life, retirement, and death 
He lost in the 1997 elections. After the 2002 elections he retired from active politics and was succeeded by his sons Rao Mohammad Naseem Hashim and Rao Mohammad Jamil Hashim. He is father of 6 sons and 1 daughter.
He died on Saturday July 14, 2012 and was buried in his native village in Pakpattan.

References

Government College University, Lahore alumni
2012 deaths
Punjabi people
Pakistan People's Party politicians
People from Pakpattan District
1922 births
Muhajir people
Pakistani people of Haryanvi descent